Palace Amusements was a historical indoor amusement park in Asbury Park, New Jersey. It was built in 1888 and expanded several times over its history; but after a worsening economic situation in both Asbury and the country in the mid-1980s, it went out of business in 1988.

Several efforts were made to save the structure, including its hand-carved carousel, murals and decorations, but in 2004, after an independent structural inspection, the building was deemed unsafe (it had already been damaged in several areas) and was ordered demolished. A local grassroots organization was able to save several pieces from the building, including the famed Tillie mural.

Bruce Springsteen
The Palace is mentioned in 1974 Bruce Springsteen hit "Born to Run" in the lines "Beyond the Palace, hemi-powered drones / Scream down the boulevard".

See also
National Register of Historic Places listings in Monmouth County, New Jersey

References

External links

Palace Amusements Museum
Photos of the now-demolished Palace Amusements
Save Tillie

Cultural infrastructure completed in 1888
1888 establishments in New Jersey
1988 disestablishments in New Jersey
Asbury Park, New Jersey
Defunct amusement parks in New Jersey
Amusement parks in New Jersey
Demolished buildings and structures in New Jersey
Commercial buildings on the National Register of Historic Places in New Jersey
National Register of Historic Places in Monmouth County, New Jersey
New Jersey Register of Historic Places
Amusement parks opened in 1888
Amusement parks closed in 1988
Buildings and structures demolished in 2004
Former National Register of Historic Places in New Jersey